Toni Ståhl (born 11 May 1985) is a Finnish footballer who last played for Carolina RailHawks in the North American Soccer League.

Career

Early career in Finland
Ståhl attended high school at Pohjois-Haagan Yhteiskoulu, and was part of the youth teams of the most successful Finnish club of all time, HJK Helsinki. After his time at HJK, he had a short spell with the Second Division team Atlantis Akatemia in late 2002, before joining FC Espoo in 2003.

American college career
Ståhl accepted an invitation from the University of Connecticut to play college soccer in the United States, and he joined the Connecticut Huskies for the 2006 season. He was chosen as the Big East Rookie of the Year after his first season with the Huskies, after being the only freshman to start and play in all 19 games that season. In 2009, he was named Big East Midfielder of the Year as he concluded his career with the Huskies tallying two goals and nine assists. He was also a nominee in the semifinal stage for the M.A.C. Hermann Trophy.

Professional
In December 2009, Ståhl signed a contract with Major League Soccer, even though clubs from Sweden, Denmark and English Premier League club Burnley showed interest in him.

Ståhl was subsequently drafted in the second round (17th overall) of the 2010 MLS SuperDraft by Philadelphia Union. He was sent off on his MLS debut on 25 March 2010, in a game against Seattle Sounders FC. In April 2010 he played on loan with the Union's USL-2 affiliate Harrisburg City Islanders.

On 14 January 2011, the Union announced that they declined the option on Ståhl's contract and he subsequently became a free agent.

Ståhl signed with Fort Lauderdale Strikers of the North American Soccer League on 1 April 2011. Following an impressive debut season for the Strikers, Ståhl was named to the NASL 2011 Best XI Team as one of four defenders.

Career statistics

References

External links

1985 births
Living people
Association football defenders
Association football midfielders
Finnish footballers
Finnish expatriate footballers
Helsingin Jalkapalloklubi players
UConn Huskies men's soccer players
Philadelphia Union players
Penn FC players
Fort Lauderdale Strikers players
North Carolina FC players
University of Connecticut alumni
Expatriate soccer players in the United States
Finnish expatriate sportspeople in the United States
Major League Soccer players
USL Second Division players
North American Soccer League players
Philadelphia Union draft picks
FC Espoo players
People from Tuusula
Sportspeople from Uusimaa